WMXP-LP is a low-powered FM community radio station located in (and licensed to) Greenville, South Carolina. The station broadcasts on 95.5 FM with an ERP of 100 watts.

Station history
WMXP-LP signed on the air June 10, 2007. The station is owned by the Malcolm X Grassroots Movement.  It was launched with the help of hundreds of local and national volunteers at the eleventh community radio barnraising of the Prometheus Radio Project.  It is a non-commercial station, dedicated to African-American culture programming, claiming that it "will give a voice to the voiceless, and a home to knowledge, community enrichment and social justice advocacy."

According to the FCC database, WMXP-LP went silent on May 20, 2011.  No official reason is known.

Station returned to the air on May 18, 2012 from a new transmitter site via FCC Special Temporary Authority (STA) for lower antenna height while new 120 foot tower is being constructed.  Signal strength is strong in most of the city due to unique audio processing and temporarily monophonic signal.

See also
List of community radio stations in the United States

References

External links
 
 WMXP's Live Web Stream (Shoutcast)
 
 2007 Free Press article on WMXP-LP's launch
 IEEE Spectrum article on WMXP-LP
 WMXP New Transmitter CP
 WMXP STA For Lower Height Transmission

MXP-LP
MXP-LP
Radio stations established in 2007
Community radio stations in the United States